Yangpu may refer to:

 Yangpu District, a district of Shanghai, China
 Yangpu Peninsula, a peninsula on the northwest coast of Hainan Island, China
 Yangpu Economic Development Zone, an economic development zone on Yangpu Peninsula, Hainan Province, China
 Yangpu, a village in Meichuan, Wuxue, Huanggang, Hubei, China

See also
Yang Pu (900-939), Chinese Emperor
 Yang Pu (mandarin) (1372–1446), Chinese scholar-official during the Ming dynasty
Yang Pu (footballer) (born 1978), Chinese football player and manager